Lyn Carol Brown (born 13 April 1960) is a British politician serving as Member of Parliament (MP) for West Ham since 2005. A member of the Labour Party, she was a Shadow Minister for the Home Office from 2015 to 2016, Shadow Policing Minister from 2016 to 2017, Shadow Exchequer Secretary to the Treasury from 2018 to 2020, and Shadow Minister for Prisons and Probation from 2020 to 2021.

Early life and career
Brown was born in London to Joseph and Iris Brown. She was educated at Drew Road Primary School, Silvertown and Plashet Comprehensive School before attending the Whitelands College, Putney (now part of Roehampton University). In 1984 she began work as a social worker for the London Borough of Ealing.

She was elected as a councillor to Newham London Borough Council in 1988. She unsuccessfully contested Wanstead and Woodford at the 1992 general election but was beaten by 16,885 votes by the Conservative James Arbuthnot.

Parliamentary career
In 2005, West Ham MP Tony Banks retired and Lyn Brown was selected to contest the safe Labour seat through an  all-women shortlist. Lyn Brown became the seat's MP at the 2005 general election with a majority of 9,801 votes. She made her maiden speech on 23 May 2005.

In 2006, Brown became the Parliamentary Private Secretary to the Communities and Local Government Minister, Phil Woolas. In July 2007 she was appointed Parliamentary Private Secretary to John Denham, Secretary of State for Innovation, Universities and Skills.

In June 2009 she was promoted to become an Assistant Government Whip. She remained as a whip, in opposition, following the 2010 general election.

In June 2011, Brown was criticised by campaigners for recruiting an unpaid intern whilst also supporting "a living wage for all". Gus Baker of Intern Aware stated Brown had replaced a paid member of staff with an unpaid intern, accusing her of double hypocrisy and noting how such conduct denied opportunities to poorer people such as those from Brown's constituency. Brown stated she "would like to pay everyone" in her office, but "did not have the resources to do so".

In October 2013, Brown was appointed by Ed Miliband to serve as Shadow Minister for Communities and Local Government.

In September 2015, she was appointed as a Shadow Home Office Minister by Labour leader Jeremy Corbyn, a position from which she resigned on 28 June 2016, before subsequently supporting Owen Smith in the 2016 Labour Party (UK) leadership election. In October 2016, Corbyn reappointed Brown to serve as a Shadow Minister, as Shadow Minister for Policing, during which time, Brown temporarily replaced Diane Abbott as Shadow Home Secretary during a period of ill health for Abbott.

Personal life
In May 2008 Brown married John Cullen and exercised her privilege as a member of Parliament to hold the ceremony in the Chapel of St Mary Undercroft in the Palace of Westminster. The ceremony was performed by fellow Labour MP and former vicar Chris Bryant.

Until May 2009, Brown rented a central London flat using the second home allowance, despite her constituency being only 6 miles from Westminster.

Brown's hobbies include reading crime fiction and walking.

References

External links
Lyn Brown MP official constituency website
Newham Labour Party

 

|-

1960 births
21st-century British women politicians
People from Silvertown
Alumni of the University of Roehampton
Councillors in the London Borough of Newham
Female members of the Parliament of the United Kingdom for English constituencies
Labour Party (UK) MPs for English constituencies
Living people
People educated at Plashet School
Politicians from London
UK MPs 2005–2010
UK MPs 2010–2015
UK MPs 2015–2017
UK MPs 2017–2019
UK MPs 2019–present
21st-century English women
21st-century English people
Women councillors in England